Laurel Hill was a hill on the Barlow Road of the Oregon Trail. It was one of the steepest descents of any on the Oregon Trail. Travelers considered it the worst part of the entire Oregon Trail, and had to either drag trees behind their wagons for braking or winch using ropes or chains.

References

Oregon Trail